Greece, officially the Hellenic Republic, is a country in south-east Europe.

Greece may also refer to:

Periods of the history of Greece

Prehistoric Greece
Neolithic Greece, 7000–1100 BC
Mycenaean Greece, 
Ancient Greece, 1100–146 BC
Dark Ages in Greece,  BC
Archaic Greece, –480 BC
Classical Greece, 5th and 4th centuries BC
Hellenistic Greece, 323–31 BC
Roman Greece, 146 BC – AD 330
Medieval Greece 
Byzantine Greece
Modern Greece, 1828–present
First Hellenic Republic, an unrecognized state 1822–1832
Kingdom of Greece, a monarchy during the periods of 1832–1924, 1935–41 and 1944–74
Second Hellenic Republic, 1924–35
Hellenic State (1941–1944)
Greek military junta, 1967–1974
Third Hellenic Republic, 1974–present

Other uses
Greece (European Parliament constituency)
Magna Graecia or Greater Greece, areas of southern Italy settled by Greeks since the 8th century BC
Greece (town), New York, a town in western New York
Greece (CDP), New York, a suburb of Rochester located within the town
"Greece", song by George Harrison from Gone Troppo
"Greece" (song), a 2020 song by American recording artist DJ Khaled featuring Drake

See also
Greek (disambiguation)
Grease (disambiguation) 
Grecia (disambiguation)
Hellas (disambiguation)
:Category:National sports teams of Greece for teams known as "Greece"
Names of the Greeks
National Bank of Greece